Greensville County Public Schools is a school division headquartered in Emporia, Virginia, serving that city and Greensville County.

Circa 1972 there was an effort by Emporia residents to create a separate school division. On June 22, 1972, the United States Supreme Court denied the creation of the district on a 5–4 basis, with the four dissenters having been appointed by U.S. president Richard Nixon.

Governance
The district has four school board members from Greensville County and two from Emporia.

Schools
 Greensville County High School - Emporia
 Edward W. Wyatt Middle School - unincorporated area in Greensville County
 Belfield Elementary School - unincorporated area in the county
 Greensfield Elementary School - unincorporated area in the county

References

External links
 Greensville County Public Schools
Education in Greensville County, Virginia
School divisions in Virginia